"Ase Me" (Greek: Ασε με; English: Let me) is a 2012 pop and hip hop song by the Greek-Cypriot singer Ivi Adamou featuring Kleopatra from Stavento hip hop band. 
The music is by METH, EY.O. and the lyrics by METH and MAGEDA.

Track listing
Digital download
"Ase Me" - 3:21

Credits and personnel
 Lead vocals – Ivi Adamou
 Producers – METH
 Lyrics – METH, EY.O., MAGEDA
 Label: Sony Music Greece

Music video
The filming for the music video started on December 1, 2012 by the great director in Greece, Sherif francis at Zambidis Iron Mike Club.
A teaser released on December 21, 2012.

Release history

References

Ivi Adamou songs
2012 singles
2012 songs